Bertin Samuel Zé Ndille (born 17 December 1988 in Cameroon) is a Cameroonian retired footballer.

Career

For the 2008 season, Ndille joined Örebro SK in Sweden as a springboard to a better league. Despite being wanted by Willem II, Basel, and Girondins de Bordeaux in the Dutch, Swiss, and French top flights for his performances with Örebro SK, he was playing in the French fourth division by 2012.

References

External links
 Bertin Zé Ndille at Soccerway

1988 births
Living people
Footballers from Yaoundé
Cameroonian footballers
Association football defenders
Örebro SK players
Allsvenskan players
Tarbes Pyrénées Football players
Cameroonian expatriate footballers
Expatriate footballers in Sweden
Cameroonian expatriate sportspeople in Sweden
Expatriate footballers in France
Cameroonian expatriate sportspeople in France